"Svennebanan" is a single by Swedish rapper Promoe, which was released in 2009. The song has peaked at number 1 on the Swedish singles chart.

Reception 
Editor from Arbetarbladet described "Svennebanan" as a strange euro song and said that someone might think Promoe is some kind of Basshunter with dreadlocks.

Music video
Music video was directed by Kamisol.

Track listing

Charts

Weekly charts

Year-end charts

References

External links
 

2009 singles
2009 songs